Irene Koh is a comics artist from Seoul, South Korea. She has previously worked with large comics publishers like Dark Horse Comics, DC Comics, and Marvel Comics. She was the main artist for Turf Wars trilogy of The Legend of Korra comics.

Biographical information
Koh was born on September 18, 1990 in Seoul, South Korea. Since then, she has lived in Tokyo, New England and Los Angeles. She resides in the San Francisco Bay Area, where she continues to work as a comics artist. She went to school at the Rhode Island School of Design, where she graduated with her Bachelor of Fine Arts in Illustration in 2012.

Career
Koh has had her work featured in comics published by Dark Horse Comics, DC Comics, Marvel Comics, IDW Publishing, Oni Press, and Stela. As of November 2017 she is the main penciller and inker for The Legend of Korra: Turf Wars comics. Koh is also the creator of the comic Afrina and the Glass Coffin. She has also worked on comics such as Teenage Mutant Ninja Turtles: Casey and April, Sensation Comics Featuring Wonder Woman, and Secret Origins #10: Batgirl.

Bibliography
 Batgirl (2011) vol. 01: "Batgirl of Burnside", penciller
 Teenage Mutant Ninja Turtles: Casey and April (2015) #1-4, main artist
 Sensation Comics Featuring Wonder Woman (2014) #45: 'Besties' part 1 of 3, penciller and inker
 Secret Loves of Geek Girls (2015) #1, writer
 Another Castle (2016) #1, cover artist
 Fresh Romance: The Only One (2017) One-Shot, penciller and cover artist
 The Legend of Korra: Turf Wars (2017—2018) Part One – Part Three, artist
 Afrina and the Glass Coffin, creator

References

External links
 Official website

South Korean female comics artists
Living people
1990 births
Rhode Island School of Design alumni